Turbonilla hamonvillei is a species of sea snail, a marine gastropod mollusk in the family Pyramidellidae, the pyrams and their allies.

Description
The shell grows to a length of 9 mm.

Distribution
This species occurs in the following locations:
 European waters (ERMS scope) : France
 Atlantic Ocean : the Azores.

Notes
Additional information regarding this species:
 Habitat: Known from seamounts and knolls

References

External links
 To CLEMAM
 To Encyclopedia of Life
 To World Register of Marine Species

hamonvillei
Gastropods described in 1896